David Mabanga Tutonda (born 11 October 1995) is a Congolese professional footballer who plays as a defender for League Two club Gillingham.

Career

Cardiff City
Tutonda was born in Kinshasa, DR Congo and moved to London, England with his family at the age of five. He did not start playing football until the age of 12. Tutonda was subsequently spotted by Cardiff City academy manager Neal Ardley, who signed him in October 2012. He was offered a professional contract with Cardiff in April 2014.

On 13 February 2015, he joined League Two club Newport County on an initial one-month loan. Tutonda made his Football League debut for Newport the following day in the starting line-up for the fixture against Wycombe Wanderers. Newport won the match 2–1. He scored his first Football League goal for Newport on 18 April 2015 in the 3–2 defeat to Dagenham & Redbridge.

Tutonda joined League Two club York City on 7 August 2015 on a six-month loan. He made his debut a day later in the opening match of the 2015–16 season, a 3–0 away defeat to Wycombe Wanderers. The loan was terminated early on 27 November 2015.

Barnet
On 31 December 2016, Tutonda agreed to sign for League Two club Barnet on a two-year contract, effective from 1 January 2017. He scored his first goal for the club on 29 April 2017 in a 3–1 win over Grimsby Town. He left the club at the end of the 2019–20 season, having played 113 games for the Bees, scoring five goals.

Bristol Rovers
On 28 August 2020, Tutonda joined Bristol Rovers on a free transfer, signing a two-year deal following a successful trial period. He made his debut for the club on the opening day of the season, replacing Luke Leahy in the 73 minute of a 1–1 away draw at Sunderland and made his first league start three weeks later, playing the entirety of a 2–0 home victory over Northampton Town. On 18 June 2021, Tutonda had his contract terminated by Rovers in order to allow him to pursue opportunities elsewhere.

Gillingham
Having departed Rovers, Tutonda joined Gillingham on 18 June 2021.

Career statistics

References

External links

David Tutonda profile at the Barnet F.C. website

1995 births
Living people
Footballers from Kinshasa
Democratic Republic of the Congo footballers
Association football defenders
Cardiff City F.C. players
Newport County A.F.C. players
York City F.C. players
Barnet F.C. players
Bristol Rovers F.C. players
Gillingham F.C. players
English Football League players
National League (English football) players
Democratic Republic of the Congo expatriate footballers
Expatriate footballers in England
Expatriate footballers in Wales
Democratic Republic of the Congo expatriate sportspeople in England
21st-century Democratic Republic of the Congo people